Marc L. Griffin (born May 25, 1956) is an American lawyer who became the world's youngest judge at age 17 in 1974.

Early life and education 
Griffin was born on May 25, 1956, in Greensburg, Indiana. In 1961, his parents moved the family to Beech Grove, Indiana.

In 1974, he graduated from Beech Grove High School.  He received a Bachelor of Science degree in business administration from Indiana Wesleyan University. In 1992, he was awarded the degree of Doctor of Jurisprudence by the Indiana University Robert H. McKinney School of Law.

Judicial career

Governor's appointment 
On the nomination of the Board of Commissioners of Johnson County, Indiana Griffin was appointed and commissioned by Indiana Governor Otis Bowen on February 19, 1974, as a Justice of the Peace to fill a vacancy in that office in White River Township, Johnson County, Indiana.

Indiana Attorney General opinion 
After having appointed Griffin as a Justice of the Peace, Governor Bowen requested an official opinion from Indiana Attorney General Theodore Sendak asking how the laws which define age eligibility for holding office affected his appointment of Griffin. On March 19, 1974, Sendak issued his Official Opinion No. 1 of 1974. Sendak opined that Griffin, as a 17-year-old person, was not old enough to take the oath of office as a Justice of the Peace in Indiana. The Attorney General's opinion was only advisory and would not force Griffin from office unless his appointment was challenged successfully in court. When the announcement of the opinion was picked up by the Associated Press, the story appeared in newspapers all over the United States. Editors of the news agency's newspaper members deliberately set out to hook their readers with sensational headlines that screamed controversy and catastrophe. In light of the Attorney General's opinion, Griffin and the Johnson County Board of Commissioners asked the county attorney to give his opinion and report back to them. Contrary to the Attorney General's opinion, the county attorney's opinion found no reason why Griffin could not hold the office. The county attorney offered to represent the Commissioners and Griffin should they be challenged in court.

Judicial opinion on eligibility 
Griffin and Robert W. Condit were candidates in the May 1974 Republican primary election for Justice of the Peace in White River Township. Condit filed a lawsuit against the Johnson County Election Board. Condit claimed that the Election Board was violating the law when they registered Griffin as a candidate. Condit cited the official opinion issued by Indiana Attorney General Sendak. The suit noted that the election board approved Griffin's filing as a candidate six days after the official opinion had been issued. Griffin defeated Condit in the primary election. After he was defeated, Condit amended his lawsuit against the Election Board by adding Griffin as a defendant. Condit did not prevail in his suit when a court ruled that the Attorney General's opinion was not a correct interpretation of the law. The court's ruling in that case validated Griffin's eligibility to be a candidate and to serve.

Justice of the Peace court 
On April 6, 1974, Griffin opened his courtroom in Greenwood, Indiana, and heard cases for the first time. He adjudicated civil small claims cases such as debt collection, dishonored checks, landlord-tenant issues, and property damage. On his criminal docket, he heard misdemeanor cases including vehicle moving violations, breach of the peace, shoplifting, and assault. He held surety of the peace hearings and issued peace bonds which are known in the present day as protective orders. He was legally authorized to perform civil marriages and was doing so when he was below the marriage age in Indiana.

Term of office 
His appointive term of office ended on December 31, 1974. On November 5, 1974, he won a contested general election which allowed him to continue in an elective term of office of four years. However, his elective term of office was cut short when the Indiana General Assembly abolished Justice of the Peace courts statewide effective January 1, 1975.

Guinness World Records 
Griffin holds the Guinness World Records title of the World's Youngest Judge.

In 1990, being unaware of Griffin's earlier achievement, Guinness World Records awarded the title of World's Youngest Judge to John Payton. Payton, at age eighteen years, nine months, and fourteen days old, was elected a judge as a Collin County, Texas, Justice of the Peace on November 6, 1990.

Griffin had achieved the record at an age younger than Payton on his appointment as a judge on February 19, 1974, at the age of seventeen years, eight months, and twenty-five days old. Griffin also achieved the record at an age younger than Peyton on being elected as a judge on November 5, 1974, at the age of eighteen years, five months, and eleven days. However, it was not until 2011 that Guinness World Records became aware of Griffin's achievements and correctly awarded the title to him, who had set the record 37 years earlier.

Bar admissions and legal career 
Unlike most judges, his bar admissions did not come until after his judicial career.  In 1993, he was admitted to the bar of the Indiana Supreme Court, United States District Court for the Northern District of Indiana, United States District Court for the Southern District of Indiana, and the United States Court of Appeals for the Seventh Circuit.  In 1996, he was admitted as an attorney and counselor of the Supreme Court of the United States.
In his first year of the practice of law he was a solo practitioner in Indianapolis. From 1994 to 1997 he was a partner at Griffin & Smith in Indianapolis. From 1998 to 2021 he was a partner at Griffin, Hicks & Hicks in Greenwood, Indiana. His practice focused on real estate law.

References 

American judges
American justices of the peace
Politics in popular culture
Indiana University Robert H. McKinney School of Law alumni
Living people
Indiana lawyers
21st-century American lawyers
20th-century American judges
20th-century American politicians
1956 births
Amateur radio people
Real property lawyers